Manic Drive is a Canadian Christian rock band, formed in 2004 by brothers Michael and Shawn Cavallo. After receiving interest from a record label, they released Reason for Motion in May 2005. Over the last several years, the band has released albums including Reset and Rewind (2007), Blue (2009), Epic (2011), VIP (2014), Into the Wild (2017), and Vol. 1 (2020).

Band history 

Manic Drive formed in 2004 after disbanding Christian family band One Cross with two members: Shawn Cavallo, former lead singer and drummer and brother Michael Cavallo. The band went through several lineup changes early in their career, starting with session musician Lucas Wright. In April 2004, following a GMA showcase, Manic Drive were signed to Butterfly Music Group (now Whiplash Records). In May 2005 they released their debut album, Reason for Motion. Singles "Luckiest", "Nebulous", "Memories" and "Middle of it All" all hit the R&R Top 30 Christian Rock charts, debuting high in the top 10. In late 2005, they toured with Seventh Day Slumber and Fireflight.

Manic Drive recorded their follow-up album, releasing it in 2007, titled Reset & Rewind. After the album was released, Lucas Wright left the band, and former members Phil Massicotte (bass and backup vocals) and Johnny Dimarco (drums) were enlisted. In 2008, the band released their single "Blue", featuring Kevin Max of DC Talk, which reached number No. 28 on the Top 30 Christian Rock Billboard chart. "Blue" was also featured as a world premiere in over 20 countries by the Gospel Music Channel, and was No. 2 only to Skillet's "Comatose" as the best Rock Video of 2009. The album was praised by critics, with CCM Magazine listing Reset & Rewind in the Critic Picks Top 10 Albums of 2007, along with Relient K and Anberlin.

In 2009, Manic Drive parted with Phil Massicotte and Johnny Dimarco and added drummer Anthony Moreino, converting into a three-piece band. On August 18, 2009, Manic Drive re-released Reset & Rewind, renaming it Blue and adding several new songs including "Walls", "Music" and "Rain". CCM Magazine (January 2010 issue) listed Blue No. 7 in their Top 10 picks of 2009. In late of 2009, they toured with 80s metal band Stryper on their "25th Anniversary Tour".

In January 2010, Manic Drive released "Walls", which hit No. 7 on the Christian CHR Billboard Charts Top 30, No. 9 on Christian Music as well as hitting No.  1 on AIR 1 Radio.

In 2011, Manic Drive worked with producer Rob Wells and released Epic September 27, 2011. The lead single, "Halo", was consistently voted No. 1 on syndicated radio network Air 1's Mixology (a voting program on weeknights). In further support of Epic, Manic Drive toured back-to-back with the Newsboys across Canada on the "Maple Noise Tour" followed by "The Born Again Experience Tour" in the U.S. that fall.

Through 2012, Good Times climbed up to No. 12 on Top 30 CHR/HOT AC Billboard Chart, No. 1 on CRW and No. 1 in Canada on the CT-TOP 20.

In 2013, "Money" placed No. 27 on Top 30 CHR/Hot AC Billboard Chart and No. 2 on the Air 1 Radio Network. Following the media attention, Manic Drive was invited to team up with Audio Adrenaline on their spring "Kings and Queens Tour" which in turn, landed them a deal with Inpop/Capitol. Manic Drive finished the year touring across Canada on the Christmas "Wintour" with Building 429 and Hawk Nelson.

VIP was released on October 14, 2014. In February and March 2016, Manic Drive headlined the VIP Experience Tour with dates coast to coast across the United States. "Easier" was released June 23, 2017 and "Mic Drop" was released July 17, 2017, as singles for an upcoming album.

Into the Wild was released on November 7, 2017. They played part in the 2019 Winter Jam Tour, performing during the event's Pre-Jam Party.

Discography 

VIP was released on October 14, 2014, as an independent album album. Their first single from this album "VIP" hit No. 1 on Billboards Christian Rock Chart, and No. 12 on Billboards Christian CHR / Hot AC Chart.

Awards and recognition 

 Gospel Music Association of Canada Covenant Awards

 2008 winner - Rock Album of the Year: Reset & Rewind
 2008 winner - Video of the Year: "Eleven Regrets"
 2012 winner - Hard Rock/Alternative Album of the Year: Epic
 2015 winner - Rock Album of the Year: "VIP"

 Gospel Music Channel Music Video Awards

 2009 nominee, Best Rock Video: "Blue"

 Shai Awards (formerly The Vibe Awards)

 2002 nominee, Best Rock Alternative Album of the Year: Welcome to the Real World
 2003 nominee, Best Song of the Year

 Juno Awards

 2015 Winner, Best Christian Album "VIP"
2019 nominee, Contemporary Christian/Gospel Album of the Year "Into the Wild"

References

External links 

 

Musical groups established in 1996
Musical groups from Toronto
1996 establishments in Ontario
Juno Award for Contemporary Christian/Gospel Album of the Year winners
Canadian Christian rock groups